Richard Friedenberg is an American screenwriter and film director.  He wrote the screenplay for A River Runs Through It (1992), starring Brad Pitt, for which he was nominated for an Academy Award, and the screenplay for the Hallmark Hall of Fame television film Promise (1986), starring James Garner and James Woods, for which he won an Emmy Award.  He also wrote the screenplay for Dying Young starring Julia Roberts and wrote and directed The Education of Little Tree (1997).

References

External links

American male screenwriters
American film directors
Living people
Primetime Emmy Award winners
Year of birth missing (living people)
Place of birth missing (living people)